Gymnophyton is a genus of flowering plants belonging to the family Apiaceae.

Its native range is Chile to Western Argentina.

Species:

Gymnophyton flexuosum 
Gymnophyton foliosum 
Gymnophyton isatidicarpum 
Gymnophyton polycephalum 
Gymnophyton robustum 
Gymnophyton spinosissimum

References

Azorelloideae
Apiaceae genera